Olaf 'Ollie' Prattl (born 15 September 1950) is an Australian former rugby league footballer who played in the 1960s and 1970s. He played for Balmain, Western Suburbs, Cronulla-Sutherland and Parramatta in the New South Wales Rugby League (NSWRL) competition.

Background
Prattl played for NSW Country Seconds and gained the attention of Balmain who signed him as an 18 year old in 1968.

Playing career
Prattl made his first grade debut in 1969 for Balmain.  Balmain would go on to reach the 1969 NSWRL grand final against South Sydney but Prattl missed the match due a broken leg which occurred in a game against Newtown about a month before the decider.  Balmain would go on to win their 11th and final premiership defeating a highly fancied Souths team 11–2 at the Sydney Cricket Ground.

Prattl played with Balmain until the end of 1971 and then signed with Western Suburbs.  Prattl only played the one season at Wests before joining Cronulla-Sutherland.  Prattl only played 3 games across 2 seasons at Cronulla and did not play in the club's maiden grand final appearance.

In 1975, Prattl joined Parramatta and featured in 6 games before departing the club.  Prattl then went on to play rugby league in the Illawarra competition.

References

1950 births
Living people
Balmain Tigers players
Western Suburbs Magpies players
Cronulla-Sutherland Sharks players
Parramatta Eels players
Australian rugby league players
Rugby league wingers
Rugby league centres
Rugby league locks
Rugby league five-eighths
Rugby league players from New South Wales